The brown cockroach (Periplaneta brunnea) is a species of cockroach in the family Blattidae. It is probably originally native to Africa, but today it has a circumtropical distribution, having been widely introduced. In cooler climates it can only survive indoors, and it is considered a household pest.

This cockroach is similar in appearance to the American cockroach (P. americana), but darker in color and with thicker, wider, triangular cerci. It is a reddish-brown color and has fully developed wings. It reaches up to 4 centimeters in length.

It produces an ootheca about 1.2 to 1.6 centimeters long containing about 24 eggs on average.

It is an omnivore.

References

External links
Black and white photographs of top view of P. brunnea male and female specimens, from Smithsonian Miscellaneous Collections.
 Drawings of body parts of male P. brunnea; plate VII, figures 12-16 show detail of the pronotum, end of abdomen with cerci, genital process, subgenital plate, and supra-anal plate with cerci. From a 1917 article by Morgan Hebard, with a key to the figures on page 280.

Cockroaches
Insects described in 1838